University of Agricultural Sciences, Bangalore (UAS Bangalore) is located in Bengaluru, India. It was established in 1964 as UAS Bangalore by a legislative act.

History

Origin
The British government in India, shaken by several famines in India, set up a commission to improve the state of agriculture to reduce the impact of famines. This led to the Famine Commission of 1880 and in 1889 a commission was set up with Voelcker to examine agriculture in India. About 30 acres of land was then acquired at Hebbal for experimental fields. Later in 1906, Leslie Coleman, a Canadian Entomologist and Mycologist succeeded Lehmann and served for 25 years.

The increasing reputation of this experimental station as a training center led to the foundation of the Mysore Agricultural College at Hebbal in 1946 affiliated to the Mysore University. This was soon followed by the Agricultural College at Dharwad in 1947 which was then affiliated to Karnataka University. In 1958, veterinary science as a discipline was started with the establishment of the Veterinary College at Hebbal also affiliated to Mysore University.

Formation

In 1948 a University Education Commission had been started under S. Radhakrishnan with members that included Zakir Hussain and the American educationist J.J. Tigert, and Arthur Ernest Morgan. They examined the Land-Grant colleges of the United States as a potential model for rural and agricultural education. This recommendation was taken up in 1961 with the formation of an Indo-American team to develop the universities and their curriculum. This resulted in a first Joint Indo-American team in 1954 that studied American universities leading to US-AID supported collaboration between American and Indian universities. A second team was established in 1959 that made recommendations to make agricultural universities autonomous and to have veterinary, home science, and agricultural education on a single campus with integrated teaching, extension and research. This was followed by a committee headed by Ralph W. Cummings of the Rockefeller Foundation, along with Ephraim Hixon of the USAID, L. Sahai (Animal Husbandry Commissioner) and K.C. Naik as convener. The then Mysore State Government through its Act No. 22 passed in 1963 provided for the creation of the University of Agricultural Sciences. The university came into existence on 21 August 1964 and was meant to serve the agricultural education needs of the state of Karnataka with a campus that included the old experimental stations at Hebbal established by Lehmann and Coleman with an additional campus at GKVK added in 1969. K.C. Naik served as the first Vice Chancellor. The UAS was inaugurated on 21 August 1964 by Vice President of India Zakir Hussain in the presence of Chester Bowles, United States Ambassador to India and S. Nijalingappa, Chief Minister of Karnataka. On 12 July 1969, Prime Minister Indira Gandhi inaugurated GKVK campus with its buildings designed by the architect Achyut Kanvinde who was influenced by Walter Gropius. The Ford Foundation made a grant of $331000 in 1966 to develop graduate research in entomology at the university.

The University initially included the agricultural colleges at Hebbal and Dharwad, the Veterinary College at Hebbal, the fisheries college at Mangalore, and 35 research stations located in different parts of the state following agroclimatic zonation and focus on specific crops along with 45 ICAR projects which were with the State Department of Agriculture, Horticulture, Animal Husbandry and Fisheries.

Later years and growth
Later on the Marine Product Processing Training Centre (MPPTC) at Mangalore and Krishi Vigyan Kendra, Hanumanamatti, Dharwad were also transferred to the university.

The university established the Fisheries College at Mangalore in 1969 to provide degree level training and the Agricultural Engineering Institute at Raichur in the same year to offer a three-year diploma course in Agricultural Engineering. The Home Science College was started to impart education on rural based home science at Dharwad campus in 1974, besides establishing a College of Basic Sciences and Humanities and College of Post Graduate Studies at Hebbal.

The phenomenal growth of the university, the differences in agroclimate in the parts of the state, led to the bifurcation of the university into two agricultural universities. An amendment to the University of Agricultural Sciences Act in 1986 saw the birth of the second university for agriculture in the state. The University of Agricultural Sciences, Bangalore was entrusted territorial jurisdiction over 15 southern districts of Karnataka comprising nearly fifty percent of the total area of the state, while the University of Agricultural Sciences, Dharwad, was given jurisdiction over the remaining area in the northern districts of the state.

In 2005, with the needed to provide better autonomy to the veterinary education and research in the state, the Veterinary and Animal sciences faculty was bifurcated form both the Universities of Agricultural Sciences - Bangalore and Dharwad and placed under the single university - Karnataka Veterinary, Animal and Fisheries Sciences University with its headquarters in the northern district of Karnataka, Bidar by the passing of the Karnataka Veterinary, Animal and Fisheries Sciences University Bill, 2004 in the Legislative Assembly on 10 February 2004.

Headquarters and Colleges
The University of Agricultural Sciences, Bangalore currently has administrative headquarters at the Gandhi Krishi Vigyana Kendra (GKVK) on the Bangalore-Hyderabad Highway.

It has the following colleges:
 College of Agriculture, Bengaluru at Gandhi Krishi Vigyana Kendra
 College of Agriculture, Mandya
 College of Agriculture, Hassan
 College of Sericulture, Chintamani
 College of Agricultural Engineering, Gandhi Krishi Vigyana Kendra, Bengaluru
 College of Agriculture, Chamrajnagar

Ranking and notability
In 2001, the university was recognised as the best agricultural university in India by the Indian Council of Agricultural Research for which it was conferred the Sardar Patel Outstanding ICAR Institution Award for excellence in teaching, research and extension. In 2008, UAS was ranked third among state agriculture universities.

In 2012, the university was recognised as the best agricultural university in India by the Indian Council of Agricultural Research for which it was conferred the Sardar Patel Outstanding ICAR Institution Award for excellence in teaching, research and extension. In 2021, the university was recognised as the best agricultural university in South India and 3rd best state university in India.

University of Agricultural Sciences Bangalore has been accredited by the Indian Council of Agricultural Research with an “A” Grade for a period of five years from March 28, 2021, to March 27, 2026.

Degrees offered

The university began its academic activities with two-degree programmes covering broadly agriculture and veterinary disciplines. Over the years, attempts have been made to diversify agricultural education by starting specialized undergraduate and postgraduate degree programmes in various branches of agricultural sciences.

Presently the university currently offers seven-degree programmes covering Agriculture, Sericulture, Agribusiness Management, Food Technology, Biotechnology, Agricultural Engineering , Food, Nutrition & Dietetics  disciplines and master's degree programmes in 25 disciplines and Ph.D. programmes in 17 disciplines.

Notable people

Alumni
 Sonny Ramaswamy, former director of the USDA's National Institute of Food and Agriculture
 M. Mahadevappa, Former Vice-chancellor of University of Agricultural Sciences, Dharwad
 Krishna Ella, Chairman & Managing Director, Bharat Biotech
 Kalidas Shetty, Professor at University of Massachusetts Amherst
 Tapas Kundu, Director of Central Drug Research Institute
 G. Parameshwara, 8th Deputy Chief Minister of Karnataka and Former President of the KPCC
 R. Dhruvanarayana, Member of Parliament, Lok Sabha (16th Lok Sabha)
 S. M. Raju, Principal Secretary in Government of Bihar
 D. K. Ravi, Former Additional Commissioner of Commercial Taxes in Bangalore
 K. Puttaswamy, Assistant Director in Kannada Development Authority
 R. Heli, Former Director of Agriculture of the state of Kerala
 Subbanna Ayyappan, Former Director-General of Indian Council of Agricultural Research (ICAR) and Secretary to Government, Department of Agricultural Research and Education (DARE)and Padma Shri awardee.
 Dinesh Addihalli Nagegowda, Professor at CSIR-CIMAP

Faculty
Retired
 Magadi Puttarudriah, first professor of entomology
K. N. Ganeshaiah
C.A. Viraktamath

See also 
 University of Agricultural Sciences, Dharwad
 University of Agricultural and Horticultural Sciences, Shimoga
 University of Agricultural Sciences, Raichur
 University of Horticultural Sciences, Bagalkot
 Karnataka Veterinary, Animal and Fisheries Sciences University

References

External links 

 
 UAS, Bengaluru collected news and commentary at The Times of India

Agricultural universities and colleges in Karnataka
University of Agricultural Sciences
1964 establishments in Mysore State
Educational institutions established in 1964
Biodiversity Heritage Sites of India